Vette may refer to:

Automobiles
 Chevrolet Corvette, a sports car manufactured by GM since 1953
 Chevrolet Chevette, a subcompact car manufactured by GM for model years 1976-1987

Entertainment
 Vette!, a 1989 racing video game
 Vette (Star Wars), a character in Star Wars: The Old Republic

Other uses
 Vette Hundred, a hundred of Sweden
 Vicky Vette (born 1965), Norwegian pornographic actress

See also
 Vet (disambiguation)
 Vett (disambiguation)
 Vættir or vetter, creatures in Nordic folklore